Papilio hoppo is a species of swallowtail butterfly. It is found only in Taiwan.

The larvae feed on Citrus species.

References

Other sources
Erich Bauer and Thomas Frankenbach, 1998 Schmetterlinge der Erde, Butterflies of the world Part I (1), Papilionidae Papilionidae I: Papilio, Subgenus Achillides, Bhutanitis, Teinopalpus. Edited by  Erich Bauer and Thomas Frankenbach.  Keltern : Goecke & Evers ; Canterbury : Hillside Books   plate 3, figure 4

External links
 Butterfly corner Images from Naturhistorisches Museum Wien

hoppo
Lepidoptera of Taiwan
Endemic fauna of Taiwan
Butterflies described in 1907
Taxa named by Shōnen Matsumura